Ikalamavony is a small town in Haute Matsiatra region, in the hills of southern central Madagascar with a population of 35,114 in 2018.
It is the capital of the district.

Communes
To the district of Ikalamavony also belong the communes:
 Ambatomainty - (45 km from Ikalamavony)
 Fitampito - (50 km from Ikalamavony)
 Ikalamavony
 Mangidy - (35 km from Ikalamavony)
 Solila - (46 km from Ikalamavony)
 Tanamarina Sakay
 Tanamarina (also named Tanamarina Bekisopa)
 Tsitondroina

Roads
The partly unpaved National road 42 links the town to  Isorana and Fianarantsoa (90 km).

Rivers
Matsiatra in the North, and the  Mananantanana river in the South.

References

Populated places in Haute Matsiatra